These are lists of Oregon-related topics, attempting to list every list related to the state of Oregon.

 If the type is list, the article is primarily a list of articles.  If type is context, each entry contains summary information useful to compare and contrast entries.
 Approx. entries was the number of article entries within the article at one time.  The value can be helpful for determining the relevancy or depth of the article.

See also

List of Oregon-related topics

Indexes of topics by U.S. state